National Cyber Security Awareness Month (NCSAM) is observed in October in the United States of America. Started by the National Cyber Security Division within the Department of Homeland Security and the nonprofit National Cyber Security Alliance, the month raises awareness about the importance of cybersecurity.

History
In 2004, the Department of Homeland Security and the National Cyber Security Alliance launched National Cyber Security Awareness Month as a broad effort to help Americans stay safe and secure online. Initial efforts included advice like keeping antivirus programs up to date. Since 2009, the month has included an overall theme, "Our Shared Responsibility," and weekly themes throughout the month were introduced in 2011

References

External links
National Cyber Security Awareness Month, Homeland Security
National Cyber Security Awareness Month, National Cyber Security Alliance
Cyber Security Awareness Month 2020 Champions

United States Department of Homeland Security
Month-long observances
October observances
Computer security
Observances in the United States
Awareness months